List of museums in Ireland may refer to:

 List of museums in Northern Ireland
 List of museums in the Republic of Ireland